Bhujakhia Pir (tomb of Hajrat Swale Mohammad) is situated at Sunhat at the heart of the city is the tomb of Sufi saint Aasthana Sharif Hazrat Pir named as Hajrat Swale Mohammad better known as Bhujakhia Pir. The shrine of Baba  Bhujakhia pir of Balasore stands as a symbol of harmony between Muslim and Hindu. During the occasion of Urs, a crowd gathers at the shrine comprising both Hindu and Muslims. This is an age-old tradition.

The legend tells that Hajrat Swale Mohammad from Baghdad, Iraq named afterwards as ‘Bhujakhia Pir’ had come to Orissa in the 16th century and devoted himself to the service of mankind, especially to the service of Cholera victims.In his begging, he asked for the daily food of the people of Balasore and only the bhuja (Puffed Rice/Mudhi)which was always available in all the houses.  People used to call him Fakir Baba.  Fakir's Baba kept asking for food.  Whatever Baba get, he would distribute to all the children in the evening.  In his begging, he asked for the daily food of the people of Balasore and only the bhuja (mudhi) which was always available in all the houses.

In the 1800s, people from all over the world came to worship the ancestor of Bhujakhia Pir Baba. But most of the Hindus did not go near Pir Baba near the pond. The first "Urus or Urus" festival was started in 1952 on the advice of Hazrat Maulana Mohammad Habibur Rahman, the father of Dhamnagar. That Urus word was Arabic. The other meaning of the word was worship or mental festival. Urus was celebrated every Thursday. But that was later the custom of celebrating the "Urus" festival almost once a year, after counting a particular month and date. This 'Urus' festival was celebrated by the Hindus and played a major role in the Hindus. When it was formally launched in 1952, it was headed by Kabiraj Lambohar Das of Sunhat. Besides Mahindra Das, Shiva Parida and Qazi Mohammad Reza started it in the traditional way. It has been celebrated for three days a year since 1970. The first day of Urus is Wednesday Baba's place is washed by adding 75 କଳସ  (Jar of Water) water from the Budhabalanga river and adding sandalwood . This is called a "gosal bath". On Thursdays, Buffed Rice is offered to the for Wish(ମାନସିକ). There is an Feast on Friday.

Before the urs of Hajrat swale Mohammad the urs of Ahmed shah baba is observed. Urs of Bhujakhia pir astana is celebrated at the last Wednesday,Thursday and Friday of March. It is very popular in Balasore, even people from outside the balasore come to observe it. When he first came to balasore he seat under a neem tree where now there is his astana. Previously it open towards up side but it is nicely built. It comes on the way going to Chandipur. People go to Astana on Thursday and worship there for whatever they want. Many people read quran there. Many people also tie thread at the left side of inner wall in belief that when baba will complete their wish they will untie this. People use Bhuja ([Puffed rice]) as Sirni. Veg Biryani/langar made from Arua rice and various vegetable. It is eaten by people of both Hindu and Muslim communities.

The newly married couples come there and wish for the well being of their spouse and family members.
The annual Fateha (Urs Swalehiya) is observed on 10, 11 & 12 April 2013.

Buildings and structures in Odisha
Balasore district
Balasore